La vedova e il piedipiatti is an Italian television series directed by Mario Landi and consisting of six episodes. It stars Ave Ninchi, Enrico Papa and Veronica Lario and it was one of the last RAI productions shot in black and white.

The serial is set in Turin; the two protagonists are the young police inspector Lombardi (Enricco Papa) and his landlady Avatar (Ave Ninchi), an eccentric widow, fortune teller and amateurish detective. Avatar helps Lombardi in his enquiries, with unorthodox but effective methods; besides, she tries unsuccessfully to match him with her pupil Maria Teresa (a young Veronica Lario, the future Silvio Berlusconi's wife).

See also
List of Italian television series

External links
 

Italian television series
Films directed by Mario Landi
1979 Italian television series debuts
1970s Italian television series